The men's eight competition at the 1948 Summer Olympics took place at Henley-on-Thames, near London. It was held from 5 to 9 August. There were 12 boats (108 competitors) from 12 nations, with each nation limited to a single boat in the event. The event was won by the United States, the nation's sixth consecutive and eighth overall gold medal in the men's eight; the Americans had won every time they competed (missing 1908 and 1912). Great Britain, the only other nation to have won in the event, finished second for its first medal in the event since 1928. Norway took bronze, its first medal in the men's eight since 1920.

Background

This was the 10th appearance of the event. Rowing had been on the programme in 1896 but was cancelled due to bad weather. The men's eight has been held every time that rowing has been contested, beginning in 1900.

The United States was the dominant nation in the event, with the nation winning the previous five Olympic men's eight competitions (as well as the other two competitions which the United States had entered). The American squad this year came from the University of California, Berkeley. Their primary challenger was Great Britain, represented by the Thames Rowing Club, the 1948 Grand Challenge Cup winners. Italy, the two-time reigning silver medalists, had won the 1947 European Rowing Championships.

Ireland and Portugal each made their debut in the event. Canada, Great Britain, and the United States each made their eighth appearance, tied for most among nations to that point.

Competition format

The "eight" event featured nine-person boats, with eight rowers and a coxswain. It was a sweep rowing event, with the rowers each having one oar (and thus each rowing on one side). 

The venue, Henley-on-Thames, imposed certain restrictions and modifications to the format. The course could handle only three boats at a time (and this required expansion of the typical Henley course), so the six-boat final introduced in 1936 was not possible this time. The course distance was also modified; instead of either the 2000 metres distance that was standard for the Olympics or the 1 mile 550 yards (2112 metres) standard at Henley, a course that was somewhat shorter than either was used. Sources disagree on the exact distance: 1929 metres is listed by the Official Report, though other sources say 1850 metres.

The 1948 competition had four rounds: three main rounds (quarterfinals, semifinals, and a final) as well as a repechage after the quarterfinals.

 The 12 boats were divided into 4 heats of 3 boats each for the quarterfinals. The winner of each heat (4 total) advanced directly to the semifinals, while the 2nd and 3rd place boats (8 total) went to the repechage.
 The repechage had 8 boats. They were placed in 3 heats, with 2 or 3 boats each. The winner of each repechage heat (3 boats) rejoined the quarterfinal winners in the semifinals, with the other boats (5 total) eliminated.
 The semifinals placed the 7 boats in 3 heats, with 2 or 3 boats per heat. The winner of each heat (3 boats total) advanced to the final, while the other boats (4 total) were eliminated.
 The final round consisted of a single final for the medals.

Schedule

All times are British Summer Time (UTC+1)

Results

Quarterfinals

The first boat in each heat advanced directly to the semifinals. The other boats competed again in the repechage for the remaining spots in the semifinals.

Quarterfinal 1

Quarterfinal 2

Quarterfinal 3

Quarterfinal 4

Repechage

The winner of each race advanced to the semifinals, while the other boats were eliminated.

Repechage heat 1

Repechage heat 2

Repechage heat 3

Semifinals

The winner of each race advanced to the final, while the other boats were eliminated.

Semifinal 1

Semifinal 2

Semifinal 3

Final

References

External links

Rowing at the 1948 Summer Olympics